P. C. H. Clarke was the ninth Surveyor General of Ceylon. He was appointed in 1883, succeeding A. B. Eyers, and held the office until 1893. He was succeeded by G. D. Mantell.

References

C